Eumecynostomum is a genus of worms belonging to the family Mecynostomidae.

The species of this genus are found in Europe.

Species:

Eumecynostomum altitudi 
Eumecynostomum asterium

References

Acoelomorphs